Abraham Joseph Rice (born Abraham Reiss) (c. 18001862) was the first ordained rabbi to serve in a rabbinical position in the United States.

Rice was born in 1800 or 1802 at Gochsheim, near Schweinfurt, Lower Franconia.  An injury in infancy left him with a limp.  He studied at the Würzburg yeshivah, and was ordained by Rabbi Abraham Bing.  He later continued his studies at the yeshivah of Rabbi Wolf Hamburger in Fürth, and then headed a small yeshivah in the village of Zell, near Würzburg. In the 1830s he married Rosalie Leucht, and in 1840 they immigrated to the United States.  After a brief attempt at reviving the Jewish community in Newport, Rhode Island, he accepted an appointment as the first rabbi of Congregation Nidche Israel in Baltimore.

Rice usually delivered his sermons in German, later occasionally in English, and insisted on retaining all the traditional piyyutim in the prayers. His constant battle against assimilation and lax observance of shabbat and kashrut brought him into conflict with many of his congregants.  When he decreed that Sabbath-breakers should not be called to the Torah, there was such resistance that he had to back down; but he insisted that while they could be called up, nobody should answer "amen" to the blessings they recited.  After an 1842 incident in which he objected to Masonic rites held at a Jewish funeral, some members left the congregation and founded the Har Sinai Verein, the first lasting Reform congregation in the United States.

Rice was known throughout the United States and Germany as a learned Talmudist, and as the only ordained rabbi in the country he was asked to decide many questions of halacha. He was an uncompromising opponent of Reform, a frequent writer in Isaac Leeser's The Occident, and advocated establishing an American beth din to strengthen Jewish observance. In 1845 he established a Hebrew school, one of the earliest in the United States.

In 1849, finding it impossible to resist the demand for reforms at Nidche Israel, he resigned his position, founded his own synagogue which was strictly Orthodox; to support himself he opened a dry goods store, and then a grocery. He also began a minyan likely in his home at this time; this congregation was to evolve into Congregation Shearith Israel and remain Orthodox for its complete history. In 1862, he was asked to return to the rabbinate of Nidche Israel, with the promise that it would remain strictly Orthodox. He died several months later.  In 1871, an organ was introduced and the Reform prayer book was adopted, and Nidche Israel became a Reform temple.

References
Abraham Rice Reiss at the Jewish Encyclopedia. Accessed 2007-08-04.
Goldman, Yosef. Hebrew Printing in America, 1735-1926, A History and Annotated Bibliography (YGBooks 2006). .
Singer, Shmuel. From Germany to Baltimore: The first Rabbi to hold a position in the United States, first published in The Jewish Observer
Levine, Yitzchok. Abraham Rice Reiss: First Rabbi In America, The Jewish Press, November 4, 2009
 Part 2, December 2, 2009
"The Messiah, A Sermon, By the Rev. Abraham Rice, of Baltimore, on the Sabbath Before Passover" September 1843

Notes

American Orthodox rabbis
American people of German-Jewish descent
German emigrants to the United States
Religious leaders from Baltimore
1800s births
1862 deaths
Jews and Judaism in Baltimore
People from Schweinfurt (district)
German Orthodox rabbis
19th-century American rabbis